Biru is a town in and the seat of the Biru County, eastern Tibet Autonomous Region, Western China. Biru is located on the Gyalmo Ngulchu River (upper part of Salween River).

See also
List of towns and villages in Tibet Autonomous Region

Populated places in Nagqu
Township-level divisions of Tibet
Tibet